Araki may refer to:

People
 Araki (surname) (荒木)
 Hirohiko Araki (荒木 飛呂彦), a Japanese manga artist, fashion designer and illustrator
 Nobuyoshi Araki (荒木 経惟), a Japanese photographer and contemporary artist also known by the mononym Arākī

Places
 Araki Island, an island in Vanuatu
 Araki language, the language spoken on that island
 Araki Station (Fukuoka)

Objects
 アラキ, a historic Japanese name for the liquor shōchū. 
 The Araki, a sushi restaurant in London
 Araki (restaurant) (あら輝), a former sushi restaurant in Tokyo
 alternative spelling for Araqi, a Sudanese liquor
 an Ethiopian liquor; see Ethiopian cuisine

See also
Arak (disambiguation)
Araqi (disambiguation)
Arrakis (disambiguation)